Live at Cobo Hall is a live album by American musician Hank Williams Jr. The full title is Hank Williams Jr. Live at Cobo Hall Detroit. The album was issued by MGM Records as number SE 4644 and later re-issued by Polydor Records as 811 902–1.

Track listing
All tracks composed by Hank Williams; except where indicated

Side one
 "Jambalaya" – 1:46
 "Detroit City" (Danny Dill, Mel Tillis) – 2:52
 "Games People Play" (Joe South) – 2:41
 "Standing in the Shadows" (Hank Williams Jr.) – 3:14
 "Foggy Mountain Breakdown" (Earl Scruggs) – 1:57
 "You Win Again" – 2:51

Side two
 "She Thinks I Still Care" (Dickey Lee, Steve Duffy) – 2:48
 "Darling, You Know I Wouldn't Lie" (Hollis Delaughter, Wayne Kemp) – 3:46
 "I'm So Lonesome I Could Cry" – 2:36
 "I Saw The Light" – :55

Personnel
Hank Williams Jr. – vocals, guitar
Technical
Val Valentin – director of engineering
Sid Maurer – art direction
Jim O'Connel - cover design
Jerry Dempnock – photography

External links
 Hank Williams Jr's Official Website

1969 live albums
Hank Williams Jr. live albums
MGM Records live albums
Polydor Records live albums